{{DISPLAYTITLE:C20H24N2}}
The molecular formula C20H24N2 (molar mass: 292.42 g/mol, exact mass: 292.1939 u) may refer to:

 Dimetindene
 Enprazepine
 Glyoxal-bis(mesitylimine)

Molecular formulas